The Estonian Young Athlete of the Year is chosen annually each December, since 2006. The winner is the sportsperson who is voted by a group of sports journalists and sports associations, to have achieved the most that year.

List of award winners

See also
 Estonian Athlete of the Year
 Estonian Coach of the Year
 Estonian Sports Team of the Year

References

External links
Official website 

Estonian sports trophies and awards
Awards established in 2006
2006 establishments in Estonia